Konrad Gustav Knudsen (19 August 1890 - 16 June 1959) was a Norwegian painter, journalist, and parliamentarian. Knudsen is perhaps best known for inviting Leon Trotsky to live at his house when the Norwegian government granted Trotsky political asylum in June 1935.

History 
Konrad Knudsen was born in Drammen, and was a painter like his father. He finished accounting training in 1904 and worked as a painter in Drammen until 1908 when he travelled to the United States. In the US he worked as a painter, lumberjack and a construction worker, and then became editor of the socialist publication Social-Demokraten. In 1920, Knudsen was one of the leading figures in the Scandinavian Socialist Federation that sided with the Communist International.

Knudsen returned to Drammen in 1920 and worked as a painter foreman until 1923, before he then got a job as an editor in the newspaper Fremtiden. From 1921, Knudsen held various positions within the Labour Party, and was elected to the Norwegian Parliament in October 1936, a position he would hold for the next 21 years, including in the 1940–1945 government in exile.

Knudsen was married to his wife Hilda, and they had two children, daughter Hjørdis, and son Borgar. 

In June 1935, Knudsen invited Leon Trotsky and Natalia Sedova to live at his house, following their arrival in Norway after the French government had told Trotsky that he was no longer welcome in France. For over a year, Trotsky and his wife stayed at Knudsen's house at Norderhov outside the small city of Hønefoss, not far from the Norwegian capital Oslo, although Trotsky was hospitalized at the Oslo Community Hospital for a few weeks in the autumn of 1935. During his time living at Knudsen's house, Trotsky wrote one of his most famous books, The Revolution Betrayed, a book which was completed and sent to the publisher on 4 August 1936, just prior to the infamous Trial of the Sixteen, one of the Moscow show trials. 

After a break-in at Knudsen's house by a Norwegian fascist Nasjonal Samling militia on 5 August 1936 and the Trial of the Sixteen Moscow show trial later that month, the Norwegian Minister of Justice, Trygve Lie, eventually ordered on 2 September 1936 that Trotsky and Sedova be evicted from Knudsen's house to a farm at Hurum, where Trotsky and Sedova were placed under house arrest and kept indoors for 22 hours per day, due to the mounting diplomatic pressure put on the Norwegian authorities by the Joseph Stalin led Soviet government. Trotsky and Sedova were deported from Norway on 19 December 1936, when they were placed on the Norwegian oil tanker Ruth which arrived in Mexico on 9 January 1937. 

During World War II, during the Nazi invasion of Norway from April to June 1940, Knudsen fled to the USA, the Norwegian government moved to exile in London, United Kingdom, and Knudsen then went first to Sweden, then to Canada and then the USA, working for the Norwegian government in exile information service, and with the office of the Norwegian Auditor General.

From 1949 to 1957, Knudsen was Auditor General.

References

1890 births
1959 deaths
Labour Party (Norway) politicians
Members of the Storting
20th-century Norwegian politicians
Politicians from Drammen